Eva Beck (born 25 November 1997) is a Liechtensteiner footballer who plays as a midfielder for Walperswil and the Liechtenstein national football team.

Career statistics

International

References

1997 births
Living people
Women's association football midfielders
Liechtenstein women's footballers
Liechtenstein women's international footballers